Kurth Kiln was established by the Forests Commission Victoria in 1941 on a site about 7 km north of Gembrook on the Tomahawk Creek.

Dr Ernest Edgar Kurth from the University of Tasmania was commissioned to design the kiln with the aim of mass-producing charcoal as an alternative fuel in the response to war-time petrol rationing.

Gembrook was selected as the ideal site for the Kurth Kiln because it fully met three essential criteria required for successful operation;

 Water - the kiln required 2000 gallons (9,100 litres) of water per day in order for its cooling systems to be effective.
 Wood - the kiln burnt about 28 cords (~100 cubic metres) of wood per week.
 Gradient - sloping land enabled easier top loading of wood into the kiln.

Dr Kurth was paid £5 for the use of his patented design (No 2563/41) and the total cost of establishing the kiln was 1,799 pounds 17 shillings and 2 pence.

The kiln commenced operation in March 1942 but transport difficulties combined with an oversupply of charcoal from private operators meant the kiln was used only intermittently during 1943 and was shut down soon after. Over the period of its operation, Kurth Kiln produced only 471 tons of charcoal which represented a tiny fraction of Victoria’s total production.

Petrol rationing 

Australia’s declaration of War on 2 September 1939 immediately raised concerns about the security of petrol supplies. At the time Australia was totally reliant on imported fuel and had a limited storage capacity. At the start of the war, the country had sufficient petrol for only three months supply and by May 1940 the Commonwealth Oil Board estimated that only 67 per cent of the total capacity of about 140 million gallons was on-hand.

The Federal Government considered increasing the price of fuel to dampen demand. Another plan was that petrol should be merchandised in two colours, blue for commercial vehicles, and red for private cars, with red petrol being substantially more expensive than blue. The motoring industry and newspapers resisted the changes.

When France collapsed, the Minister for Supply stressed to Cabinet that continuity of the already erratic deliveries was under threat, and on 6 June 1940 Cabinet finally made the decision that rationing should be introduced to reduce consumption by 50 per cent. Political expediency came into play and petrol rationing was introduced in September 1940 and restrictions were tightened as the War progressed.

On 17 June 1941 the Prime Minister, Robert Menzies announced further restrictions to motorists limiting them to two gallons per month which were enough for 1,000 miles per year so many simply put their cars up on blocks for the duration and switched to public transport or walked. The scheme finally devised for petrol rationing coupons was complicated, and the paperwork was profuse. Drivers had to apply for a petrol licence, from which they were allocated ration tickets based on an assessment of their needs.

Forests Commission firefighting vehicles were exempt from the petrol restrictions. District Foresters were authorised to issue petrol coupons for timber industry trucks, which, in the absence of private cars and utes, often served as family transport too. Country school buses were fitted with gas converters and on declared days of Acute Fire Danger they were banned. Some of Melbourne's buses also ran on charcoal.

Petrol rationing was not strictly enforced until 1942 but remained in place until February 1950.

Charcoal as a replacement fuel 

During the first half of the twentieth century charcoal  production in Victoria was small and employed relatively few people. The charcoal was supplied to blacksmiths, coal depots, gas works and some powerhouses. The main areas of State forest producing charcoal were in a broad arc across Central Victoria at places like Beaufort, Trentham, Lionville, Macedon, Broadford, the Dandenongs and Gembrook. Charcoal was also produced in East Gippsland, mainly at Nowa Nowa. The best trees were durable species like red ironbark (Eucalyptus sideroxylon), red box (E. polyanthemos), grey box (E. microcarpa), yellow box (E. mellidora), red gum (E. camadulensis) and for lighter grades of charcoal, yellow stringybark (E. meullerana).

The charcoal was produced by slow and controlled burning of wood in earthen, brick or metal kilns. The simplest method was the "beehive kiln" where wood was stacked vertically into a conical heap to allow air and smoke movement and then covered with a layer of sticks and twigs. The stack was then covered further with a thick layer of earth and ash.  Once the stack was alight the small chimney opening at the top was sealed. It then required constant tending to ensure no air entered the stack and took about three days to reduce the wood to charcoal. Large beehive kilns each contained about 50 cords of wood and were very labour intensive. They also produced charcoal of uneven consistency with a high ash content and some inevitable soil contamination. Other charcoal producers opted for lined pits in the ground, steel chambers or recycled boilers.

With the urging of the Federal Government charcoal quickly emerged as a substitute fuel in response to the national petrol rationing. A special vehicle-mounted unit which converted charcoal into flammable gases (principally carbon monoxide and hydrogen) was known to be suitable to power internal combustion engines.

Charcoal was relatively simple to produce but had a well-deserved reputation for being inconvenient to use for short trips, inefficient, under powered, dirty, belching black smoke, catching fire and occasionally exploding. Also, the cost of installation of a heavy and cumbersome producer gas kit was about £100, or the equivalent of 16 times the average weekly wage, and a bag of charcoal lasted between 30 and 60 miles at a cost between 6 and 10 shillings. Charcoal had a cost advantage over petrol and tests earlier in 1938-39 indicated savings in the order 80% for truck operations for producer gas compared to the cost of petrol. At the time, a new car, if you could get one, cost around £250 for a small Austin and £525 for a large Buick.

Over the war-years, some 56,000 gas producer units of varying design were fitted to private and commercial vehicles in Australia. This low conversion rate to producer gas technology represented less than 6.5% of all vehicles on the road by 1944.

The overall consumption of charcoal in Victoria rose thirtyfold from about 110 tons per month before the War to over 3300 tons by mid-1942. This massive increase required nearly 280,000 tones of dry wood annually to feed the hundreds of kilns set up across State forests, as well as on private land, at a time when labour was critically short.

Forests Commission Victoria 
The task of ensuring adequate supplies of charcoal fell to the Forests Commission Victoria (FCV). It subsequently formed the State Charcoal Branch to organise the increased production of charcoal, to build up reserves to meet emergencies and to regulate the cost to consumers. The assistance of an expert Advisory Panel, representing charcoal producers, manufacturers and distributors of vehicle gas equipment, the Department of Supply and Development, and the Victorian Automobile Chamber of Commerce, was enlisted under the Chairman of the Forests Commission, Alfred Vernon Galbraith. Preliminary arrangements were made for bag supplies, for railway sidings in Melbourne, and for processing of charcoal bought by the Branch in excess of the requirements of private grading firms. In its first year, 17,421 tons of charcoal were produced compared with 1,650 tons before the War. Production peaked at 38,922 tons in 1942-43.

The Commission had the added responsibility of providing emergency firewood to Melbourne for heating and cooking purposes as a result of reductions in the supply of coal, electricity and gas. The Emergency Firewood Project continued long after the war ended and over the period from 1941 to 1954, nearly 2 million tons of firewood was produced.

An estimated 221 kilns and 12 pits were producing charcoal by the middle of 1942. Some of the labour was provided by Italian wartime internees. There were also over 600 commercial kilns operating mostly on private property. At least 50 to 60 private charcoal retorts  were set up in the Barmah forest alone.  The majority of the kilns were metal retorts because charcoal from earthen beehive kilns or unlined pits proved unsuitable for motor vehicles, causing gumming of engine valves and the controls in the gas lines due to the condensation of tar.

The Chairman of the Forests Commission, Alfred Vernon Galbraith became aware of experiments by Dr Ernest Kurth, Professor of Chemistry at the University of Tasmania who had been experimenting with the pyrolysis of  wood and kiln designs since 1940. His work led to a quarter-size prototype kiln at Dover, Tasmania in March 1941. A second operational kiln was built at a sawmill near Launceston in January 1942.

In July 1941, Professor Kurth provided details of his kiln design and nine pages of handwritten notes on its operation to Galbraith which marked the beginning of the project at Gembrook.

The kiln was unusual in that it could operate continually with the top loading of wood billets and bottom recovery of charcoal. A water-cooled grate at the bottom of the stack caused the brittle charred wood to crumble under its own weight into manageable pieces, while at the same time maintaining the charring temperature at the critical point to produce a consistent quality charcoal. Not only was this process said to be 50% faster than any other method then in use, but it was also 10-15% more efficient. So cooled charcoal was raked out the bottom as more wood was added into the top.

Tests in Tasmania indicated that the prototype could produce about 1.4 tons of charcoal per day which compared favourably with a single ton every three days from a standard steel kiln.

Seven tons of wood produced one ton of charcoal with an output of 20 tons per week if the kiln was operated continuously with three shifts per day.

The cost of building the kiln was estimated to be about half that required for five or six portable steel kilns needed to produce the same quantity. Good quality charcoal sold for 4s 6d for a 50 lb bag.

The claimed advantages could not be ignored by an organisation under pressure to secure Victoria's war-time charcoal supplies, so Galbraith enclosed £5 to Professor Kurth in a letter on 16 July 1941 for the use of his patented design.

Gembrook site 

The selection of the suitable site on State forest for Professor Kurth's kiln depended on adequate supplies of water, wood, and gradient.

Firstly, the kiln needed approximately 2000 gallons (9100 litres) per day for its cooling system, secondly, it needed about 28 cords (100 cubic metres) of wood per week as feedstock, and thirdly a slope of approximately 18 feet (6 metres) was required to facilitate top loading. The site chosen at Tomahawk Creek about 7 km north of Gembrook met all these requirements.

Water was supplied by an old mining race from the Tomahawk Creek which also powered a water wheel operating a vibrating screen to grade the charcoal before bagging.

Much of the Gembrook landscape had been cleared for agriculture, supported a thriving timber industry and also mined for gold and gemstones since 1859 so most of the older mature forest had been disturbed in some way. More importantly, a large area of older and damaged messmate trees (Eucalyptus obliqua) in the nearby State forest had been deliberately ringbarked as a silvicultural treatment to encourage new regeneration growth by Forests Commission unemployment relief workers some 10 years earlier during the 1930s depression.  Approximately 145 men had worked over nearly 4000 acres during 1930-31. This left a large amount of standing dry wood suitable for the kilns operation within a one-mile radius.

Access to roads and the railway station at Gembrook for transport was an important consideration.  There was also a critical shortage of labour to operate the kiln during the war years which was exacerbated by a major timber salvage program underway in the Central Highlands after the deadly 1939 Black Friday bushfires. Although the site at Gembrook had not been severely burnt in either 1926 or 1939.

Earth works commenced in late August 1941. A construction contract for the kiln was awarded to builders Stanley and Nance of Middle Park on 17 October and the detailed design work was done by the Forests Commission’s own architect, Mr S. J. B. Hart.  Building commenced in November and by 18 December 1941 was nearly completed. The architect reported on 11 February 1942 to the Secretary of the Forests Commission that the kiln was ready for operations after a small trial run. The project cost £1799 17s 2d which included the establishment of the site, construction of the kiln, erection of buildings, purchase of equipment, the connection of telephone and supply of water. It was a sizable investment.

The kiln was a rectangular structure 4m x 3.5m x 8m high on a concrete foundation and the red brick walls were reinforced with iron strapping. The kiln held 25 tons of 3-feet-long billets per load which were carried up on a small inclined tramway to be loaded into the top.

The initial firing was on 18 March 1942 and after some initial teething problems with the steel doors the kiln was in full production by mid-1942. Combustion took two days to complete and kiln produced 243 tons of charcoal for its first financial year 1941-42. But in the latter half of the year, this reduced to only 29 tons.

Production by July 1942 had been so successful that problems of storage soon became apparent. Commissioner Finton George Gerraty reported that about 70 tons of graded charcoal was stockpiled and the storage sheds were taxed to the limit. Production was suspended to solve this short-term problem. However, at the same time the kiln suffered further structural problems. An inspection in September 1942 indicated that major repairs were required to some loosening brickwork near the inspection doors and this together with the emerging oversupply of charcoal raised serious questions about Kurth Kilns future.

Continuing transport and distribution difficulties from Gembrook combined with an oversupply of charcoal from private operators meant the kiln was used only intermittently during 1943 and was shut down soon after.

Petrol rationing also eased at the end of the War reducing the demand for charcoal but didn't end until 1950.

Over the total period of its operation, Kurth Kiln produced 471 tons of charcoal which represented only a tiny fraction of Victoria’s total production. But Kurth Kiln was a victim of circumstance and not the "white elephant" that these low production figures might suggest.

Forest workers camp 
After the cessation of war hostilities, the Kallista District of the Forests Commission advised in February 1946, that they could absorb 40 returned servicemen for silvicultural, afforestation, fire protection, and utilisation works. This was part of a five-year statewide plan drawn up and approved by the Allied Works Council  with funding allocated for the first two-year period totalling £3,842,175. Similar camps were established on State forest to house and employ migrants and refugees from war-torn Europe.

To provide accommodation, eighteen masonite huts were purchased from the Army and erected at the site. By July 1946 the Commission decided to make Kurth Kiln its main base camp for the region to house 80 to 100 men. The forest camp operated continuously until 8 January 1963 when three huts were burnt by bushfires. The remaining buildings began to slowly deteriorate and construction of an all-weather road network meant workmen could be housed at nearby townships instead. The site declined through to the 1970s.  Three huts were demolished and the material used to modify a remaining one as a caretaker’s residence in about 1984 for Ron Thornton who lived on-site for another 16 years. The sheds were then mainly used as storage of eucalyptus seed needed for regeneration works and for Forests Commission equipment such and pumps and hoses. The small dam next to the kiln was regularly used to as a pump school to prepare staff for the summer fire season.

Kurth kiln began its transformation into a picnic ground in about 1978 led by District Forester Frank May with works supervised by two local overseers Tom Steege and Bob Ferris.

The site is now registered as historical and scientific significance with Kurth Kiln being included as an indicative place on the Register of the National Estate (004495) as well as being listed in the Heritage Inventory of archaeological sites maintained by Heritage Victoria (H8022-0013). Remnants of a historic steel charcoal kiln can also still be found at nearby Tonimbuk and another at Kinglake West.

Parks Victoria is now responsible for Kurth Kiln and has undertaken conservation works on several of the most urgent building repairs. A small and active volunteer friends group formed in June 1999 which helps to protect and interpret the site.

Gallery

References

External links 

McHugh, Peter. (2020). Forests and Bushfire History of Victoria : A compilation of short stories, Victoria.  https://nla.gov.au/nla.obj-2899074696/view

Forests Commission Retired Personnel Association (FCRPA) - Peter McHugh - https://www.victoriasforestryheritage.org.au/
 https://www.friendsofkurthkiln.org.au/

Forestry in Australia
Government agencies of Victoria (Australia)
Charcoal
Kilns